La Bien Querida (The Well Liked) is the stage name Ana Fernández-Villaverde (born in Bilbao, November 6, 1972) used to develop her musical career. A painter by trade, she decided to initiate in 2007 her trajectory into the music world, motivated by the frontman of Los Planetas.

Biography 
In 2007, and supported by Horacio Nistal, she recorded her first demo, which would be selected as the best demo of the year by the magazine Mondosonoro.

2008 brought various updates supported by Antonio Luque's group and EP by the label Elefant Records with which, in 2009, she published her debut album Romancero, produced by David Rodríguez (frontman of Beef and La Estrella de David), who recovered the seven songs from the EP and five more. Romancero was chosen as best national disc of 2009 by the magazine Mondosonoro. y Rockdelux.

On March 7, 2011, the  digital edition of their second album was released, Fiesta, followed by the CD on March 22.

Preceded by the single "Arenas movedizas", Ceremonia, her third studio album, went on sale November 5, 2012. Album that, according to the liner notes, sounded "darker and more electronic ending en some moments of an authentic symphony of infinite noises, cold and penetrating." ("más oscuro y electrónico terminando en algunos momentos en una auténtica sinfonía de ruidos infinitos, fríos y penetrantes").

Discography

Albums 
 
Romancero (Elefant Records 2009).
Ya no
Corpus Christi
De momento abril
A.D.N.
9.6
Cuando lo intentas
El zoo absoluto
Medidas de seguridad
Bendita
Santa Fe
Los estados generales
Golpe de Estado
Produced by David Rodríguez. In collaboration with the Arab Orchestra of Barcelona and Joe Crepúsculo.
Music videos of the canciones De momento abril (dirigido por Les Nouveaux Auteurs), 9.6 (dirigido por Luis Cerveró), and Corpus Christi (dirigido por Nadia Mata Portillo) were made.

Fiesta (Elefant Records 2011).
Noviembre
Hoy
Queridos tamarindos
Sentido común
Piensa como yo
Cuando el amor se olvida
La muralla china
Monte de piedad
En el hemisferio austral
Me quedo por aquí
Monumentos en la luna
Lunes de Pascua
Produced by David Rodríguez. A music video de la canción Hoy was filmed (directed by CANADA).

Ceremonia (Elefant Records, 2012)
Arenas movedizas
Luna nueva
Hechicera
Carnaval
A veces ni eso
Los picos de Europa
Pelea
Aurora
Más fuerte que tú
Mil veces

Premeditación, nocturnidad y alevosía (Elefant Records, 2015)
CD compilation of their three 12" maxi-singles Premeditación, Nocturnidad, and Alevosía

Poderes extraños
El origen del mundo 
Alta tensión 
Disimulando
Ojalá estuvieras muerto
Encadenados'Carretera secundariaCrepúsculoMúsica contemporáneaVueltasGeometría existencialMuero de amor Singles and EPs 
9.6 (Elefant Records 2009 ER-375 cd-single).9.6 (Romancero)
9.6 (Milkyway Dreamy Mix) (remezcla de Guille Milkyway)
9.6 (French Hot Dog) (remezcla de Hidrogenesse)
9.6 (En casa de Ana) (versión de la maqueta)
9.6 (vídeo musical)

Hoy (Elefant Records 2011, sólo disponible en formato digital).
Hoy

Queridos Tamarindos (Elefant Records 2011 ER-288 single 7" en vinilo rojo).
Queridos Tamarindos
No es terrestre
Diferente

Arenas movedizas (Elefant Records 2012, sólo disponible en formato digital).
Arenas movedizas

Premeditación (Elefant Records 2014, maxi-single 12")
Poderes extraños
El origen del mundo 
Alta tensión
Disimulando

Nocturnidad (Elefant Records 2014, maxi-single 12")
Ojalá estuvieras muerto
Encadenados
Carretera secundaria
Crepúsculo

Alevosía (Elefant Records 2015, maxi-single 12")
Música contemporánea
Vueltas
Geometría existencial
Muero de amor

Collaborations 
La Bien Querida has done, to date, the following collaborations: 
Vocals on the song "Tú hueles mejor" on the album En la cama con Anntona (Gramaciones Grabofónicas 2009) de Anntona, guitarist of Los Punsetes. 
 Vocals on No sé cómo te atreves and La veleta from the Los Planetas disk, Una ópera egipcia (Octubre / Sony Music Entertainment 2010).
Voz en el tema "Ciencias Exactas" del single homónimo de Ed Wood Lovers, editado por Elefant Records en 2011.

References

External links 
 La Bien Querida at MySpace.
 La Bien Querida at Elefant Records

Spanish rock singers
Rock en Español musicians
1974 births
People from Bilbao
Living people
Basque musicians
21st-century Spanish singers
21st-century Spanish women singers